Myron H. Ranney (July 12, 1845/1846 - September 26/27, 1910) was an American soldier who fought in the American Civil War. Ranney received his country's highest award for bravery during combat, the Medal of Honor. Ranney's medal was won for his gallantry at the Second Battle of Bull Run in Virginia on August 30, 1862. He was honored with the award on March 23, 1895.

Ranney was born in Franklinville, New York, entered service in Dansville, New York, and was buried in Tumwater, Washington.

Medal of Honor citation

See also
List of American Civil War Medal of Honor recipients: Q–S

References

1846 births
1910 deaths
American Civil War recipients of the Medal of Honor
People of New York (state) in the American Civil War
People from Franklinville, New York
Union Army soldiers
United States Army Medal of Honor recipients